The Cathedral of the Intercession of the Mother of God and of St. Andrew the Firstcalled is a Catholic cathedral of the Ukrainian rite located in Munich, Germany.

It is the Ukrainian Greek Catholic cathedral of the Apostolic Exarchate in Germany and Scandinavia for the Ukrainians (Exarchatus Apostolicus Germaniae and Scandiae) that was created in 1959 by decision of Pope John XXIII through the bull "Cum ob immane."

References

External links
Official Site
 GCatholic.org information

Ukrainian diaspora in Germany
Ukrainian Catholic cathedrals
Eastern Catholicism in Germany
Eastern Catholic cathedrals in Germany